The  (known in English as the Eagle's Nest) is a Nazi-constructed building erected atop the summit of the Kehlstein, a rocky outcrop that rises above Obersalzberg near the southeast German town of Berchtesgaden. It was used exclusively by members of the Nazi Party for government and social meetings. It was visited on 14 documented instances by Adolf Hitler. Today, it is open seasonally as a restaurant, beer garden, and tourist site.

Construction 

The Kehlsteinhaus sits on a ridge atop the Kehlstein, a  subpeak of the Hoher Göll that rises above the town of Berchtesgaden. It was commissioned by Martin Bormann in the summer of 1937. Paid for by the Nazi Party, it was completed in 13 months. Twelve workers died during its construction.

It cost  to build (about $247 million USD, inflation-adjusted for 2022). Hitler's birthday in April 1939 was considered a deadline for the project's completion, so work continued throughout the winter of 1938, even at night with the worksite lit by searchlights.

From a large car park, a  entry tunnel leads to an ornate elevator that ascends the final  to the building. The tunnel is lined with marble and was originally heated with warm air from an adjoining service tunnel. However it was normal for visiting high-officials to be driven through the tunnel to the elevator. Their driver would then have to reverse the car for the entire length of the tunnel as there was no space to turn.

The inside of the large elevator is surfaced with polished brass, Venetian mirrors, and green leather. The building's main reception room is dominated by a fireplace of red Italian marble presented by Italian dictator Benito Mussolini, which was damaged by Allied soldiers chipping off pieces to take home as souvenirs. The building had a completely electric appliance kitchen, which was unusual in 1937, but was never used to cook meals; instead meals were prepared in town and taken to the kitchen on the mountain top to be reheated.  The building also has heated floors, with heating required for at least two days before visitors arrived. A MAN submarine diesel engine and an electrical generator were installed in an underground chamber close to the main entrance, to provide back-up power.

Much of the furniture was designed by Paul László.

Use 

Hitler first visited on 16 September 1938 and returned to inaugurate it on 20 April 1939, his 50th birthday, though it was not intended as a birthday gift.

There are two ways to approach and enter the building: the road and the Kehlsteinhaus elevator. Hitler did not trust the elevator, continually expressed his reservations of its safety, and disliked using it; his biggest fear was that the elevator's winch mechanism on the roof would attract a lightning strike. Bormann took great pains to never mention the two serious lightning strikes that occurred during construction.

The Kehlsteinhaus lies several miles directly above the Berghof, Hitler's summer home. In a rare diplomatic engagement, Hitler received departing French ambassador André François-Poncet on 18 October 1938, here. It was he who coined the name "Eagle's Nest" for the building while later describing the experience; this has since become a commonly used name for the Kehlsteinhaus.

A wedding reception for Eva Braun's sister Gretl was held there following her marriage to Hermann Fegelein on 3 June 1944. While Hitler more often than not left the entertaining duties to others, he believed the house presented an excellent opportunity to entertain important and impressionable guests.

Referred to as the "D-Haus", short for "Diplomatic Reception House", the Kehlsteinhaus is often conflated with the teahouse on Mooslahnerkopf Hill near the Berghof, which Hitler walked to daily after lunch. The teahouse was demolished by the Bavarian government after the war, due to its connection to Hitler.

Allied capture 

The Kehlsteinhaus was a target for the 25 April 1945 Bombing of Obersalzberg. This was a Royal Air Force bombing raid conducted by No. 1, No. 5, and No. 8 Group and No. 617 Squadron. The small house proved an elusive target for the force of 359 Avro Lancasters and 16 de Havilland Mosquitoes, which bombed and severely damaged the Berghof area instead.

It is uncertain which Allied military unit was the first to reach the Kehlsteinhaus. The matter is compounded by popular confusion of it and the town of Berchtesgaden taken on 4 May by forward elements of the 2nd Armored Division (France) or elements of the 7th Infantry Regiment of the 3rd Infantry Division of XV Corps of the U.S. Seventh Army of the Sixth Army Group.

Reputedly, members of the 7th went as far as the elevator to the Kehlsteinhaus, with at least one person claiming that he and a partner continued on to the top. In a Library of Congress interview and more recent interviews, Herman Louis Finnell of the 3rd Infantry Division said that his regiment entered the Berghof, not the Kehlsteinhaus. However, the 101st Airborne claims it was first both to Berchtesgaden and the Kehlsteinhaus.

Meanwhile elements of the French 2nd Armored Division, Laurent Touyeras, Georges Buis, and Paul Répiton-Préneuf, were present on the night of 4-5 May and took Hitler's personal items and several photographs before Americans arrived and before leaving on 10 May at the request of U.S. command, and so say the numerous testimonies of the Spanish soldiers who went along with them.

Undamaged in the 25 April bombing raid, the Kehlsteinhaus was subsequently used by the Allies as a military command post until 1960, when it was handed back to the State of Bavaria.

Today 

Today the building is owned by a charitable trust, and serves as a restaurant offering indoor dining and an outdoor beer garden. It is a popular tourist attraction to those who are attracted by the historical significance of the "Eagle's Nest." The road has been closed to private vehicles since 1952 because it is too dangerous, but the house can be reached on foot (in two hours) from Obersalzberg, or by bus from the Documentation Center there. The Documentation Centre currently directs visitors to the coach station where tickets are purchased. The bus ticket is ostensibly an entry ticket as it permits the holder entry to the building's elevator. The buses have special modifications to take on a slight angle, as the steep road leading to the peak is too steep for regular vehicles. The Kehlsteinhaus itself does not mention much about its past, except in the photos displayed and described along the wall of the sun terrace that documents its pre-construction condition until now.

Informal tours of the Kehlsteinhaus are available to be booked through the official website. Due to concern about neo-Nazis and post-war Nazi sympathizers, no external guides are permitted to conduct tours.

The lower rooms are not part of the restaurant but can be visited with a guide. They offer views of the building's past through plate-glass windows. Graffiti left by Allied troops is still clearly visible in the surrounding woodwork. The red Italian marble fireplace remains damaged by Allied souvenir hunters, though this was later halted by signage posted that the building was U.S. government property, and damage to it was cause for disciplinary action. Hitler's small study is now a storeroom for the cafeteria.

A trail leads above the Kehlsteinhaus towards the Mannlgrat ridge reaching from the Kehlstein to the summit of the Hoher Göll. The route, which is served by a Klettersteig, is regarded as the easiest to the top.

Gallery

See also 

 Berghof
 Führer Headquarters

References 

Informational notes

Citations

External links 

  Official website.
  Historical Overview and Guide.
 
  360° Virtual Tour of Kehlsteinhaus.
 
  Pictures 

Berchtesgaden Alps
Buildings and structures in Berchtesgadener Land
Führer Headquarters
Houses completed in 1938
World War II sites in Germany
1938 establishments in Germany